Catsburg may refer to:

 Nick Catsburg, Dutch race driver
 Catsburg Store